The wrestling competition at the 2018 Mediterranean Games was held from 24 to 27 June at the Vila-seca Pavilion in Vila-seca.

Medalists

Men's freestyle

Men's Greco-Roman

Women's freestyle

Medal table

References

External links
2018 Mediterranean Games – Wrestling
Results book

Wrestling
2013
Mediterranean